Melas is a mountainous village in the regional unit of Kastoria, Western Macedonia, Greece. It belongs to the municipality of Kastoria and specifically to the municipal unit of Korestia. The previous name of the village was Statista (or Stathista or Agios Efstathios after the homonymous Orthodox church of Agios Efstathios). A museum dedicated to Pavlos Melas and the Greek struggle for Macedonia now operates in the village.

Name
Before 1927 the village was called Statista. The name of the village was changed to Melas, after the Greek fighter (makedonomachos) Pavlos Melas who lost his life there.

History
In 1873, the village was recorded as having 60 households with 180 male Bulgarian inhabitants.

In 1900, Vasil Kanchov gathered and compiled statistics on demographics in the area and reported that the village of Statitsa was inhabited by about 600 Christian Bulgarian inhabitants.

On October 12, 1904, Pavlos Melas and his group headed to Statista (modern-day Melas). In the village, the native collaborator of Melas, Dinas Stergiou divided the men of the group into five houses. In the village, however, there was an organized Bulgarian army, a member of which alerted the Ottoman army to the presence of the Greek army. On October 13, the village was surrounded by an Ottoman detachment of 150 men and a fighting broke out. The dawn of the next day would find Pavlos Melas dead under an unspecified area.

External links 
The end of Pavlos Melas and the sources (in Greek) from istorikaxronika.com

References

Populated places in Kastoria (regional unit)